Prostanthera chlorantha, commonly known as green mintbush, is a species of flowering plant in the family Lamiaceae and is endemic to the south-east of South Australia. It is a small shrub with small, broadly egg-shaped to round leaves and mauve, bluish green, or greenish red to greenish yellow flowers with a pink tinge.

Description

Taxonomy
Green mintbush was first formally described in 1853 by Ferdinand von Mueller who gave it the name Klanderia chlorantha in the journal Linnaea. In 1870 Mueller changed the name to Prostanthera chlorantha and the change was published by George Bentham in Flora Australiensis.

Distribution and habitat
Prostanthera chlorantha grows in scattered populations in mallee and shrubland in the south-east of South Australia.

References

chlorantha
Flora of South Australia
Lamiales of Australia
Taxa named by Ferdinand von Mueller
Plants described in 1853